Cassini is a surname. Notable people with the surname include:

 Alexandre Henri Gabriel de Cassini (1781–1832), French botanist and naturalist, son of Jean-Dominique de Cassini
 Arthur Cassini (1836–1913), Russian diplomat
 César-François Cassini de Thury (1714–1784), French astronomer and cartographer, son of Jacques, who developed the Cassini projection
 Dominique, comte de Cassini (1748–1845), first Count Cassini, French astronomer and cartographer, son of César-François
 Giovanni Domenico Cassini (1625–1712), also known as Jean-Dominique Cassini, Italian-French astronomer
 Henri Cassini (1781–1832), known as Henri Cassini, French botanist, youngest son of Jean-Dominique
 Igor Cassini (1915–2002), American gossip columnist, writing as "Cholly Knickerbocker"
 Jacques Cassini (1677–1756), French astronomer, son of Giovanni Domenico
 Oleg Cassini (1913–2006), American fashion designer